CS Otopeni was a Romanian professional basketball club, based in Otopeni, Romania. In 2006, the team promoted for the first time ever in the first division. The previous season (2008–09) was the most successful in the club's history, CS Otopeni finishing 6th in the regular season, qualifying for the playoffs semifinals, and playing the Romanian Cup final.

On 4 January 2012 CS Otopeni withdrew from the Liga Națională and was dissolved, due to financial problems.

References

External links
Official Website

Sport in Ilfov County
2001 establishments in Romania
2012 disestablishments in Romania
Defunct basketball teams in Romania
Basketball teams established in 2001
Basketball teams disestablished in 2012